The Ghost Rider is a 1935 American Western film directed by Jack Jevne, starring Rex Lease, Bobby Nelson, and Ann Carrol.

Cast
 Rex Lease as Dave Danford
 Bobby Nelson as Bobby Bullard
 Ann Carrol as Linda Bullard
 Franklyn Farnum as Jim Bullard
 Lloyd Ingraham as Rufe
 Blackie Whitcomb as Bull
 Ed Parker as Wirt
 Jack Ward as Chalky
 John Alexander as Sheriff
 Edward Coxen as Dad Burns
 Lafe McKee as Jake
 Bill Patton as Max
 William Desmond as Guard
 Art Mix as Guard

References

American Western (genre) films
American black-and-white films
1930s American films